Douglas Eric Liman (born July 24, 1965) is an American film director and producer. He is known for directing the films Swingers (1996), Go (1999), The Bourne Identity (2002), Mr. & Mrs. Smith (2005), Jumper (2008), Edge of Tomorrow (2014), and American Made (2017).

Most of his career has been associated with the production company Hypnotic. He is co-owner with Dave Bartis, whom he met as an undergraduate at Brown University where they co-founded Brown Television (BTV) and the National Association of College Broadcasters (NACB).

Liman is on the advisory board of the Legal Action Center and the Arthur Liman Public Interest Program at Yale Law School.

Early life and education
Liman was born in New York City, the son of Ellen (née Fogelson), a painter and writer, and Arthur L. Liman, a lawyer well known for his public service, which included serving as chief counsel for the Senate Iran-Contra hearings.  Liman is Jewish, from a prominent New York family.

Liman began making short films while still in junior high school and studied at International Center of Photography in New York City. While attending Brown University, he helped to co-found the student-run cable television station BTV and served as its first station manager. He also co-founded the NACB, the first trade association geared to student-staffed radio and television stations, in 1988.

Liman attended the graduate program at University of Southern California, where he was tapped to helm his first project in 1993, the comedy film Getting In.

Career
Liman's first major success was Swingers, released in 1996. The film, written by Jon Favreau and based on Favreau's life, is a comedy about struggling actors amid the L.A. club milieu. Liman raised the funding and the film was made on the cheap, starring Favreau and his friends (Vince Vaughn, Ron Livingston, and Patrick Van Horn), ultimately cost $250,000. The film was a critical success, and jump-started the careers of Liman and the featured actors. Liman sold the film to Miramax for $5.5 million.

Liman next directed Go (1999), which tracks the events of a drug deal gone wrong through three different points of view as plot lines diverge and reconverge; Liman was also the film's cinematographer. The film was a modest success, grossing $28.4 million worldwide against a $20 million budget, and garnered positive reviews from critics.

In 1999, Liman shot a commercial for Nike featuring Tiger Woods.  

Liman next directed the 2002 action thriller The Bourne Identity starring Matt Damon, an adaptation of the 1980 Robert Ludlum novel. The film was a box office success, earning over $200 million, and began a Bourne film franchise that has since included four additional films. Liman only directed the first Bourne film, but served as an executive producer for three of the four sequels (2004's The Bourne Supremacy, 2007's The Bourne Ultimatum and 2016's Jason Bourne).

Liman executive-produced and directed the first two episodes ("Premiere" and "The Model Home") of the successful Fox prime time drama The O.C. (2003–2007). Liman produced and directed a series of comedy shorts for the Chrysler Film Project and Cannes Film Festival entitled Indie Is Great.

Liman also directed Mr. & Mrs. Smith (2005), a comedic thriller about an increasingly distant married couple, both secretly assassins, who are hired to kill each other. The film was Liman's most commercially successful to date, and is well known for the off-screen romance that developed between stars Brad Pitt and Angelina Jolie after making the film.

In 2005, Liman signed on to direct the pilot episode of NBC's television series Heist, which is about a season-long attempt to rob three jewelry stores on Beverly Hills' swanky Rodeo Drive. Also that same year, the production company Hypnotic has struck a deal with NBC Universal Television Studio. Shortly afterwards, he renamed the production company from Hypnotic to Dutch Oven.

His film adaptation of Steven Gould's science fiction novel Jumper was released in 2008.

In 2009, he co-founded the website 30ninjas.com which is geared towards fans of action movies and television, gaming, extreme sports and viral videos. He also maintains a blog on the site.

Liman directed 2010's Fair Game, about the Plame affair, which competed for the Palme d'Or at the 2010 Cannes Film Festival.

In 2011, Liman directed and produced I Just Want My Pants Back, a television series that aired on MTV. He produced Covert Affairs and Suits, two original series on the USA Network. He directed the film adaptation of the Hiroshi Sakurazaka novel, All You Need is Kill, released as Edge of Tomorrow (2014), starring Tom Cruise. In 2017, he directed Aaron Taylor-Johnson and John Cena in the military thriller The Wall, and directed Cruise again, in the crime-action film American Made, a biopic of pilot Barry Seal.

In August 2016, Liman signed on to direct Dark Universe, a film set within the DC Extended Universe and based on superhero team Justice League Dark after leaving the adaptation of Gambit. However, Liman has departed from the project due to schedule conflicts with the film Chaos Walking (2021), that Liman was working on that time.

In January 2020, Liman announced that the Edge of Tomorrow sequel, Live Die Repeat and Repeat, was currently in its early planning stages.

In May 2020, it was reported that Liman would be directing, writing, and producing a fictional movie shot in outer space. Tom Cruise is set to star and produce. Both will fly to space and to the International Space Station as part of the SpaceX Axiom Space-2 mission.

In November 2021, it was reported that Liman was in talks to direct a remake of the 1989 film Road House, with Jake Gyllenhaal starring. The film was officially greenlit on August 2, 2022 by Amazon Studios, with Liman and Gyllenhaal's involvement confirmed, with production beginning later that month in the Dominican Republic.

In March 2022, Liman signed on to direct and executive produce a television series adaptation of the 2015 book Red Notice: A True Story of High Finance, Murder, and One Man's Fight for Justice by activist and financier Bill Browder.

In December 2022, it was announced Liman would direct heist film The Instigators, starring Matt Damon and Casey Affleck, for Apple Studios, marking Liman's first film with Damon since The Bourne Identity. 

In January 2023, the 2023 Sundance Film Festival premiered Liman's documentary Justice, about sexual misconduct charges against 2018 Supreme Court nominee Brett Kavanaugh. Despite some 4,500 tips to the FBI tip line, it appears they were forwarded to the White House without serious investigation and Kavanaugh was confirmed by the Senate in October 2018, just three months after nomination The film was meant to further the unfinished investigation; with limited resources, Liman says it's still incomplete and warrants further investigation by authorities. Justice was produced in great secrecy to avoid the chance of release interference.

Filmography

Film
Director

Documentaries
 Justice (2023)

Producer
 Mail Order Wife (2004)

Executive producer
 The Bourne Supremacy (2004)
 The Bourne Ultimatum (2007)
 The Killing Floor (2007)
 Jason Bourne (2016)
 The Phantom (2021)

Television

References

External links

 "The Liman Identity" – New York Magazine biography
 
 www.30ninjas.com – Doug Liman's Action Website

1965 births
Living people
20th-century American Jews
Brown University alumni
Ethical Culture Fieldston School alumni
Film directors from New York City
Science fiction film directors
USC School of Cinematic Arts alumni
Space tourists
American television directors
American television producers
21st-century American Jews
American cinematographers